Total Living Network (TLN) is a religious broadcasting channel based in Aurora, Illinois.

TLN operates two feeds, one for the Chicago metropolitan area and carried mainly on Comcast/Xfinity digital cable systems in that area with a schedule customized for the Central Time Zone, and the other ("TLN West") for the Western United States with a limited number of terrestrial over-the-air affiliates and customized for the Pacific Time Zone. Both feeds carry the same programs, with slight differences in scheduling times.

In both feeds, TLN carries lifestyle-oriented Christian televangelism, infomercials, and a limited number of secular lifestyle programs.

Programs include:
 Marriage: For Better For Worse, a show dedicated to helping people restore and refresh their marriages using biblical principles
 Significant Insights, featuring one-on-one conversations with notable guests
 Aspiring Women, a women's talk show produced by TLN
 The DUI Expert, a no-frills, expert discussion on drugs, alcohol and driving hosted by William Pelarenos

TLN is also involved in the production of original specials, such as The Da Vinci Code Deception, and is committed to producing new types of Christian programming to reach seekers and to build up the Church. Much of TLN's programming consists of televangelism from outside providers that are distributed on numerous other televangelism networks, including Enjoying Everyday Life with Joyce Meyer, In Touch Ministries with Charles Stanley, Sid Roth's It's Supernatural!, The 700 Club, Joseph Prince, and numerous others.

The network airs a limited amount of syndicated secular programming, including Small Town Big Deal, Real Life 101 (to meet E/I mandates), P. Allen Smith Gardens, Lindner's Fishing Edge and Business First AM. The remainder of the program time is sold to infomercials.

TLN's building and Aurora property were purchased by Hobby Lobby in January 2010.

External links
 
 TLN's Pacific Time Zone feed

Religious television stations in the United States
Television stations in Illinois
Aurora, Illinois
Television channels and stations established in 1985
1985 establishments in Illinois